KFEQ (680 AM) is a commercial l radio station in St. Joseph, Missouri.  It is owned by Eagle Communications and airs a news-talk-sports-farm reports radio format.  The studios and offices are on Country Lane in St. Joseph along with sister stations KKJO, KSJQ, KESJ, and KYSJ. 
 
KFEQ broadcasts at 5,000 watts using a directional antenna. The transmitter is on Miller Road, near Interstate 29 in St. Joseph. Due to the station's low frequency and 5,000 watts of power, it can be heard in Kansas City and Topeka during the day, and provides at least secondary coverage to portions of Missouri, Kansas, Nebraska and Iowa. At night, four towers are used in a directional pattern to protect Class A clear-channel station KNBR in San Francisco. KFEQ concentrates its nighttime signal toward the St. Joseph and Kansas City areas. KFEQ is also heard on a 250-watt FM translator station, 95.3 K237HF.

Programming
Weekday mornings begin with a mix of national and local news, including farm reports. KFEQ carries "America in the Morning" and "This Morning, America's First News with Gordon Deal." In late mornings, there are local talk and agricultural shows. Afternoons and nights, nationally syndicated shows are heard on KFEQ, including Dave Ramsey and Jim Bohannon."  Weekends includes the syndicated "AgriShop" program with host Gene Millard, "The Midwest Outdoors" with Fred Ramsey, 1940s and 50s radio comedies and dramas on "When Radio Was" and shows on money, health and guns.  In sports, KFEQ carries Missouri Western State University football and basketball, as well as Kansas City Royals baseball and Kansas City Chiefs football. Most hours begin with reports from Fox News Radio.

Bob Orf is Program Director, after beginning his career at KFEQ in 1975. Orf is also the Voice of the Griffons for Missouri Western State University sports, beginning football broadcasts in 1975. Orf began calling men's basketball in 1989 and women's basketball in 1992. Barry Birr is News Director and hosts "The Hotline" each weekday from 8 - 10 a.m., a local talk show. Tom Brand came to KFEQ in 1996 to serve as Farm Director from KMA in Shenandoah, Iowa.

History
KFEQ was founded by John L. Scroggin, head of the Scroggin & Co. Bank. It signed on the air on February 16, 1923, from Oak, Nebraska. Scroggin moved the station to St. Joseph in 1925 where it was noted for its live remote daily broadcasts three times each day from the St. Joseph Stockyards and four times each day from the St. Joseph Grain Exchange. The initial main broadcast studios were located in a garage on St. Joseph Avenue, but were re-located to the mezzanine level of the Hotel Robidoux in downtown Saint Joseph later that year. (There are conflicting reports as to the St. Joseph Avenue studio location as the first broadcast was reported as being from the Hotel, in the original 1926 newspaper reports.)The first broadcasts were accomplished with a temporary transmitter and antenna in the Hotel. Technical complications resulting from interaction with the steel building structure in the hotel, knocked the station off the air for two weeks in January 1927 and prompted relocation of the transmitter and antennas to the Prospect Hill area (at Poulin and Elwood Streets) near Huston Wyeth Park in northwest Saint Joseph.  KFEQ's very first broadcast from St. Joseph occurred on the evening of December 27, 1926.

Its initial schedule in 1926 was from 830pm until 11pm. During this time it moved initially from its original frequency used at Oak,Nebraska of 833 kilocycles, to 1120, to 1300.  On Nov 11, 1928 KFEQ was a partial daytimer, powered at 2,500 watts, moved to 560 kilocycles and required to go off the air at night and at certain times during the day to share the daytime frequency with WOI in Ames, Iowa.  On December 1, 1929 KFEQ moved from 560 kHz to its present frequency of 680 kHz and broadcast on a full daytime schedule. On Feb 10, 1938 the station moved its transmitter and tower to a location on Pickett Road, 3 miles east of the St. Joseph City Limits.

In 1943, the station was allowed to stay on the air around the clock, powered at 5,000 watts. At that time in 1943, the transmitter site was moved to its present location just north of St.Joseph and the current directional antenna facility was installed.  It was an NBC Blue Network affiliate, running its schedule of comedies, dramas, news and sports during the "Golden Age of Radio."  The Blue Network became ABC in 1945.

KFEQ moved its main studios from the Hotel Robidoux to the third floor of the Schneider building in 1933, and then to the 4th and 5th floors of the KFEQ building (later named the Howitt Building)at 8th and Frederick in 1947. While at the KFEQ Building, on May 2, 1948, the station placed KFEQ-FM on the air for two years on 92.3 MHz. The FM broadcasts were discontinued in June 1950. In 1956, the main studios were relocated to the KFEQ-TV building at 40th and Faraon Street.

KFEQ also had a TV station for a time, Channel 2 KFEQ-TV, which went on the air on September 27, 1953.  Even though it was based in St. Joseph, KFEQ-TV took out an advertisement in the 1957-58 Telecasting Yearbook to say it was powered at 100,000 watts and covered 37 counties, including part of the Kansas City media market.   In 1955, KFEQ-AM-TV were sold to the Midland Broadcasting Company. Midland Broadcasting was headed by singer-actor Bing Crosby and previously owned Channel 9 KMBC-TV in Kansas City. During the years KFEQ radio was part of the KFEQ-TV organization, several local personalities performed dual roles in programs on both TV and radio, among them were Bill Foster, Ron Davis, and newsman Frank Smith.

In 1969, the two stations were sold to different owners. The TV station switched to the current KQTV call sign. KFEQ kept its original call letters as it was acquired by Connie B. Gay Enterprises, using the title "KFEQ, Inc." As a result, the main studios were moved to the Frederick Towers building, located at 2400 Frederick Avenue, where they remained until 1976. In 1976, the main studios were relocated to the Provident Savings and Loan Building at 4305 Frederick Avenue.

Prior to 1974, KFEQ played easy listening, adult music and variety programs. From 1974 through the 90s, the station played country music, in addition to its farm reports, sports and news. It called itself "Country Sunshine."  It also broadcast St. Louis Cardinals baseball games. Through the 1990s, KFEQ added more talk programming and cut the amount of country music it was playing, until it made the transition to a full-time format of talk, news and farm reports. It was acquired by Eagle Communications in 1991.

One of the station's four towers was toppled in a farming accident on June 16, 2009.  All four towers were rebuilt and placed into service in 2010.

References

External links
eaglecom.net
Station Web site

News and talk radio stations in the United States
FEQ
St. Joseph, Missouri
FEQ